Elkhan Mammadov (born 1 August 1969) is an Azerbaijani fencer. He competed in the individual sabre event at the 1996 Summer Olympics.

References

External links
 

1969 births
Living people
Azerbaijani male sabre fencers
Olympic fencers of Azerbaijan
Fencers at the 1996 Summer Olympics
20th-century Azerbaijani people